Oliver Farnworth (born 5 August 1982) is an English actor. Farnworth was brought up just outside Halifax in Hebden Bridge, West Yorkshire, but moved to Sidmouth in Devon when he was fifteen. He trained at the Bristol Old Vic Theatre School. He first came to recognition in Hollyoaks playing Will Hackett from September 2006 to May 2007.

Before appearing in Hollyoaks, Farnworth appeared on stage in The Lion, the Witch and the Wardrobe and in The London Plays, written by Ed Hime and directed by Kelly Wilkinson. He has also appeared in three episodes of ITV1's 1960s medical drama The Royal, playing a character called Nev Cartwright.

In 2008 Farnworth played the leading role in Saturday Night and Sunday Morning at the Harrogate Theatre, and Lysander with the British Shakespeare Company in A Midsummer Night's Dream. In 2009 he appeared in The Merchant of Venice at Penshurst Place Gardens in Kent.

In April 2010 Farnworth appeared in the West End production of Holding the Man at the Trafalgar Studios.

In 2014 he played Florian Dupont, a Belgian refugee, in the TV series Mr. Selfridge before joining the cast of Coronation Street as Andy Carver; his departure was announced in 2016. His last scene, aired on 20 January 2017, saw him being supposedly killed by Pat Phelan (Connor McIntyre). However, on 18 August 2017, Farnworth made an unexpected and unannounced return; revealing that Phelan was in fact, holding him captive in the cellar of an abandoned house until his death on 27 October 2017. In 2019 he has appeared in the TV Series Endeavour, playing the role of the Character PC Rich Potter.

Awards

References

Living people
1982 births
English male television actors
People from Sidmouth
Male actors from Devon